Javier Manquillo Gaitán (born 5 May 1994) is a Spanish professional footballer who plays as a right-back for Premier League club Newcastle United.

Developed at Atlético Madrid, he played only 17 matches with the first team, signing with Liverpool in 2014. He went on to spend several seasons more in the Premier League, with Sunderland and Newcastle United.

Manquillo represented Spain at youth level.

Club career

Atlético Madrid

Born in Madrid, Manquillo started playing football with hometown's Real Madrid alongside his twin brother Víctor, a forward. However, in mid-2007, the club decided to release the latter and the former followed suit, with both signing for neighbouring Atlético Madrid 48 hours later. 

On 8 December 2011, Manquillo made his competitive debut for the first team, starting in a 2–1 away loss against Albacete Balompié in the Copa del Rey (3–1 on aggregate). He was subsequently an unused substitute in the matches against Real Sociedad and Málaga.

On 28 November 2012, again in the domestic cup, Manquillo appeared in his second game with Atlético's main squad, featuring 63 minutes in a 3–0 victory at Real Jaén. On 6 December, he featured in the 1–0 away defeat to Viktoria Plzeň in the group stage of the UEFA Europa League. His debut in La Liga came on 9 December, coming on for Filipe Luís late into the second half of a 6–0 home win over Deportivo La Coruña. On 3 September 2013, he signed a contract extension, keeping him at the Vicente Calderón Stadium until June 2018.

On 11 February 2014, in the first half of the Spanish Cup semi-final clash against Real Madrid, Manquillo was involved in two incidents with Cristiano Ronaldo: in the early minutes, he conceded a penalty which the Portuguese converted in the first goal of an eventual 2–0 win (5–0 aggregate). Later, after both went for an aerial challenge, he fell headfirst to the ground, going on to be sidelined for more than one month with a neck injury.

Manquillo joined Premier League club Liverpool on 6 August 2014 on a two-year loan with an option to buy after his first season. He made his debut 11 days later, playing the full 90 minutes in a 2–1 Premier League victory over Southampton. On 16 September, he won a 93rd-minute penalty in the UEFA Champions League tie against Ludogorets Razgrad, which Steven Gerrard converted to make the score 2–1 and win the match. The following week, in the third round of the Football League Cup, he converted his penalty shoot-out attempt against Middlesbrough as his team prevailed 14–13 following a 2–2 draw. After featuring in 16 matches during the first part of the season, he played just three times in 2015, never in the domestic league, and Atlético Madrid subsequently confirmed that the loan deal had been terminated.

On 27 July 2015, Manquillo joined Ligue 1 club Marseille on loan for the 2015–16 season, with an option to buy. On 25 August 2016, he signed on loan with Premier League club Sunderland for the 2016–17 season.

Newcastle United
On 21 July 2017, Manquillo signed for Premier League club Newcastle United on a three-year contract for an undisclosed fee. He scored his first goal on 11 September 2021, in a 4–1 league loss away to Manchester United.

International career
Manquillo earned 25 caps for Spain at youth level, including seven for the under-21s. He made his debut at that level on 4 September 2014, starting in a 1–0 win away to Hungary in 2015 UEFA European Under-21 Championship qualification.

Career statistics

Honours
Atlético Madrid
La Liga: 2013–14

Marseille
Coupe de France runner-up: 2015–16

Newcastle United
EFL Cup runner-up: 2022–23

Spain U19
UEFA European Under-19 Championship: 2012

References

External links

Profile at the Newcastle United F.C. website

1994 births
Living people
Spanish twins
Twin sportspeople
Footballers from Madrid
Spanish footballers
Association football defenders
La Liga players
Segunda División B players
Atlético Madrid B players
Atlético Madrid footballers
Premier League players
Liverpool F.C. players
Sunderland A.F.C. players
Newcastle United F.C. players
Ligue 1 players
Olympique de Marseille players
Spain youth international footballers
Spain under-21 international footballers
Spanish expatriate footballers
Expatriate footballers in England
Expatriate footballers in France
Spanish expatriate sportspeople in England
Spanish expatriate sportspeople in France